Qelij Khani (also Romanized as Qelīj Khānī and Qalīj Khānī; also known as Kaleh Kalitch Khāni and Qelīch Khānī) is a village in Sanjabi Rural District, Kuzaran District, Kermanshah County, Kermanshah Province, Iran. At the 2006 census, its population was 241, in 46 families.

References 

Populated places in Kermanshah County